Kelly-Ann Woodland (née Bishop, 5 November 1981) is a Scottish newsreader and journalist, who co-presents STV's central flag-ship STV News at Six, alongside John MacKay. Woodland presented STV's breakfast bulletin on Daybreak, and later Good Morning Scotland. She also presented STV Edinburgh News and Scotland Tonight.

Early life 
Kelly-Ann Bishop was born on 5 November 1981 in Bonhill in the town of Vale of Leven, West Dunbartonshire. She has three siblings; Julie, Nikki and Brian. Woodland was educated at Jamestown Primary School and Vale of Leven Academy. She graduated from University of Glasgow in 2002 with an undergraduate degree in politics and sociology.

Career

Career beginnings
While still at university Woodland had her first experience in the media industry as a researcher for STV's weekly politics programme Platform. After graduating, Woodland started work at Castle Rock FM in Dumbarton as a news reporter and bulletin reader. She joined STV in 2003 as a news assistant. Woodland was quickly promoted to production journalist and then finally reporter after a few years. From 2010 Woodland became the regular early morning presenter of the STV News on Daybreak/ Good Morning Britain(GMB). In recent years, Woodland has become one of STV's main reporters and the stand in presenter for all of their news programmes including the STV Glasgow and Edinburgh 6 o'clock news and also Scotland Tonight.

STV News at Six anchor
In September 2018 STV re-launched their flag-ship 6 o'clock news programme for the central belt of Scotland. The new format combined the existing Edinburgh and Glasgow programmes into one co-anchored programme that contained sections that opted out to east or west stories, mixed with sections that were co-anchored from both locations with links being shared by both presenters. Kelly-Ann was chosen to anchor from the Edinburgh studio with John MacKay anchoring from the Glasgow studio.

Personal life

Woodland has been married to Stuart Woodland, who is an STV cameraman, since 2012. They both live in Bonhill with their two children, Mikey and Daniel.

Lipstick Lounge
In 2013, Woodland paired up with celebrity make-up artist Annette Wiseman to launch a new website, Lipstick Lounge. The site features video tutorials on how to do make-up like a pro, while also having interviews with people to share tips and beauty secrets.

References

External links
 The Sunday Post
 atvtoday.co.uk New format article

1981 births
Living people
STV News newsreaders and journalists
Scottish women television presenters
Scottish women journalists